Hymns II is the second collection of hymns and the final studio album from 2nd Chapter of Acts, released in 1988. 2nd Chapter of Acts provided the vocals in this release. Annie Herring wrote "Purify Me".

Track listing

Personnel 

2nd Chapter of Acts
 Annie Herring – vocals, vocal arrangements
 Nelly Greisen – vocals, vocal arrangements
 Matthew Ward – vocals, vocal arrangements

Musicians
 John Andrew Schreiner – keyboards, acoustic piano, instrumental arrangements 
 Michael Thompson – guitars
 Lee Jones – bass
 Dennis Holt – drums

Production 
 Buck Herring – producer, mixing
 Dan Willard – vocal production, engineer, mixing 
 Greg Hunt – engineer, mixing 
 Bradley Grose – art direction, design, Illustration
 Buddy Owens – cover concept 
 Vern Fisher – calligraphy
 Michael Going – photography

Source:

References

2nd Chapter of Acts albums
1988 albums